Viktor Szélig (born September 22, 1975) is a Hungarian former professional ice hockey defenceman. He will be inducted into the IIHF Hall of Fame in 2023.

Career
Szélig began his career with Dunaferr SE in the OB I bajnoksag in the 1994-95 season. He played with Dunaferr in the OB I bajnoksag, and the Interliga, until he joined Diables Rouges de Briançon in 2006. Szelig has played with Briancon for the last eight years.

During his international career, Szelig has participated in two IIHF European Junior Championships, three IIHF World U20 Championship, and seventeen IIHF World Championships since 1993.

Szélig was recognized with the Torriani Award from the International Ice Hockey Federation (IIHF) for his career in international ice hockey. The award also inducted him into the IIHF Hall of Fame.

References

External links

1975 births
Dunaújvárosi Acélbikák players
Hungarian ice hockey defencemen
Living people
Sportspeople from Dunaújváros
Diables Rouges de Briançon players